Vladimir Bradonjić (born 11 December 1999) is a Bosnian professional footballer who plays as a winger for Greek Super League 2 club PAOK B.

Club career

Early career
Bradonjić started his career at FK Rudo before joining  Radnik Bijeljina's.

Radnik Bijeljina
He made his professional debut against Krupa on 22 July 2017 at the age of 17. On 18 February 2018, he scored his first professional goal against Borac Banja Luka.

PAOK
In January 2021, Bradonjić moved to Greek side PAOK. He won his first trophy with the club on 22 May, defeating Olympiacos in Greek Cup final.

PAOK B
On 1 July 2021, Bradonjic moved from PAOK to PAOK B. He made his debut against Niki Volou, scoring a goal in the first game.

International career
Despite representing Serbia on under-19 level, Bradonjić decided to play for Bosnia and Herzegovina on senior level. He was first part of under-21 team.

Career statistics

Club

Honours
Republika Srpska Cup : 2016–17, 2017–18, 2018–19 
Greek Cup: 2020–21

References

External links

 
 Footballdatabase Profile

1999 births
Living people
People from Priboj
Serbian people of Bosnia and Herzegovina descent
Serbian footballers
Serbia youth international footballers
Serbian expatriate footballers
Bosnia and Herzegovina footballers
Bosnia and Herzegovina under-21 international footballers
Bosnia and Herzegovina expatriate footballers
Association football wingers
FK Radnik Bijeljina players
PAOK FC players
Premier League of Bosnia and Herzegovina players
Expatriate footballers in Greece
Serbian expatriate sportspeople in Greece
Bosnia and Herzegovina expatriate sportspeople in Greece
PAOK FC B players